Kal Tire Place, formerly known as Wesbild Centre and Vernon Multiplex, is a 3,006 seat multi-purpose arena located in Vernon, British Columbia, Canada. There is an additional standing room capacity of 500. It was built in 2001 as an upgrade over the aging Civic Arena and became the home ice surface of the Vernon Vipers.

The Wesbild Centre was the location of the 2008 Ford World Women's Curling Championship.

On March 7, 2008, Wesbild Holdings Limited, a real-estate developing company, acquired the naming rights to the facility. The five–year, $200,000 pact, which included an additional five-year, $250,000 option, began with a public skating event in April 2008. The arena was renamed to Kal Tire Place in June 2013 after Vernon-based Kal Tire purchased the arena's naming rights for $40,000 annually over four years.

References

External links
Kal Tire Place official website

Indoor arenas in British Columbia
Indoor ice hockey venues in Canada
Indoor lacrosse venues in Canada
Sports venues in British Columbia
British Columbia Hockey League arenas
Sport in Vernon, British Columbia